Connie and Carla is a 2004 American comedy film directed by Michael Lembeck and starring Nia Vardalos, Toni Collette, and David Duchovny. The screenplay was written by Vardalos.

The film was shot in Vancouver and featured a number of local drag queens including Joan-E, Justine Tyme, Carlotta Gurl, Summer Clearance, Devana Demille, Seemore Illusion and Helena Handbag.

Plot
Connie and Carla are two performers whose lifelong friendship and co-obsession with musical theater have brought nothing but career dead ends. Despite this, they continue their optimism, hosting a variety act at an airport lounge. After accidentally witnessing a mafia hit in Chicago, they go on the run, landing in Los Angeles. After being fired from a beauty salon, they pose as drag queens and audition to host a drag revue at a gay club called "The Handlebar."

Because they sing their own songs (a rarity for queens), they are hired, and their variety show (at first titled What a Drag (Pun Intended!) then later re-titled Connie and Carla and the Belles of the Balls after they add a few friends to the act) becomes a hit.

Things are going smoothly but they make a pact not to let men interfere with their life. This causes conflict when Connie falls for Jeff, the straight brother of Robert, one of their drag queen friends. As the show gets bigger, they convince the club owner, Stanley, to convert it into a full dinner theater, and eventually their popularity threatens to expose them.

On the official opening night of the dinner theater, the mob killers catch up with them. With the help of their drag queen friends, and to great applause from the audience (who think it is part of their act), Connie and Carla take them down.

They ultimately confess their real identities to the audience and are accepted for who they are. Connie reveals herself to Jeff, who arrives after the chaos. He accepts her and becomes her boyfriend.

Cast
 Nia Vardalos as Connie
 Toni Collette as Carla
 David Duchovny as Jeff
 Stephen Spinella as Robert / Peaches
 Alec Mapa as Lee / N'Cream
 Christopher Logan as Brian / Patty Melt
 Robert Kaiser as Paul
 Ian Gomez as Stanley, the club owner
 Robert John Burke as Rudy, the sadistic crime boss
 Boris McGiver as Tibor, Rudy's gullible henchman
 Nick Sandow as Al, Connie's on-again-off-again-right-now-off boyfriend
 Dash Mihok as Mikey, Carla's boyfriend
 Chelah Horsdal as the Botoxed Friend
 Debbie Reynolds as herself
 Greg Grunberg as Studio tour guide
 Veena Sood as Mrs. Morse

Musicals referenced or featured
The following is a list of musicals referenced or featured in the film (in the order of which they are presented in the film): Barbra Streisand and Debbie Reynolds were mentioned several times before Reynolds herself appeared and performed with Connie and Carla.
 Oklahoma! – Connie and Carla perform "Oklahoma!" as young girls in their school lunchroom and in the airport lounge and "I Cain't Say No" during their audition at "The Handlebar," the gay club where they eventually become successful.
 Jesus Christ Superstar – Connie and Carla perform "Superstar" in the airport lounge and "Everything's Alright" during their first performance at The Handlebar.
 Yentl – Connie and Carla perform "Papa, Can You Hear Me?" in the airport lounge.
 Cats – Connie and Carla perform "Memory" in the airport lounge.
 The Rocky Horror Show – Peaches 'n' Creme perform "The Time Warp" at The Handlebar.
 Cabaret – Connie and Carla perform "Maybe This Time" at their audition at The Handlebar.
 Evita – Connie and Carla perform "Don't Cry for Me Argentina" at their audition at The Handlebar.
 Mame – Interludes during the picture with the character Tibor seeing several performances of Mame at different venues across the country.
 South Pacific – "I'm Gonna Wash That Man Right Outa My Hair", is part of Connie and Carla's performance in What a Drag (Pun Intended!) at The Handlebar. They also sing "There Is Nothing Like a Dame" at the end of the film with the rest of the main cast.
 Funny Girl – Connie and Carla sing "Don't Rain on My Parade", part of their performance in What a Drag (Pun Intended!) at The Handlebar.
 Thoroughly Modern Millie, The Producers, Say Goodnight, Gracie, Never Gonna Dance, Gypsy, Chicago, Mamma Mia!, Long Days Journey into Night, "Master Harold"...and the Boys, Avenue Q, Man of La Mancha, and Hairspray – Billboards for these shows are shown.
 Gypsy, Rent, and Hairspray – At this point in the film, these are mentioned by Tibor, Hairspray, of which, he got a matinée ticket, though no songs from the shows are sung. The theater productions of Rent, Hairspray, and Mamma Mia! became semi-successful movie musicals shortly after this film.
 Gypsy – "Let Me Entertain You" is performed by Connie, Carla, and the Belles of the Balls.
 Hair – Connie says the guys should enter from the back of the house on "Good Morning Starshine".
 The Music Man – Debbie Reynolds says they should enter from the back of the house on "Seventy-Six Trombones".
 Grease – Debbie Reynolds, Connie, Carla, and the Belles of the Balls sing "There Are Worse Things I Could Do".
 A Chorus Line – Connie and Carla sing "What I Did for Love".
 Guys and Dolls – Connie mentions "the Guys and Dolls tribute."

Reception

Box office
The film had a budget of $27 million, and grossed $8,085,771 domestically, and $3,255,245 in foreign release, making $11,341,016 worldwide. The film grossed $3,254,940 during its opening weekend, opening at number 13 in the 4/16-18 weekend box office. The film has been released on DVD and incorrectly has the runtime at 1 hour, 48 minutes.

Critical response
Rotten Tomatoes gives the film a 44% critic score based on reviews from 122 critics. The site's consensus states: "The two female leads, as well as energitic musical numbers, enliven an otherwise silly reworking of Billy Wilder's Some Like It Hot."

See also
 List of American films of 2004
 Drag queen
 Faux queen – Women who dress as drag queens

References

External links
 
 
 
 
 

2000s buddy comedy films
2000s crime comedy films
2000s female buddy films
2000s English-language films
2004 comedy films
2004 films
2004 LGBT-related films
American buddy comedy films
American crime comedy films
American female buddy films
American LGBT-related films
Cross-dressing in American films
Drag (clothing)-related films
Fictional couples
Films directed by Michael Lembeck
Films produced by Roger Birnbaum
Films produced by Tom Hanks
Films scored by Randy Edelman
Films set in Los Angeles
Films shot in Chicago
Films shot in Los Angeles
Films shot in Vancouver
Films with screenplays by Nia Vardalos
LGBT-related buddy comedy films
Mafia comedy films
Spyglass Entertainment films
Transgender-related films
Universal Pictures films
2000s American films